George Herbert Ward (1862–1946) was Archdeacon of Wisbech from 1924 to 1945.
 
Ward was educated at Malvern and Hertford College, Oxford and became an Assistant Master at St Paul's School, London. He was ordained Deacon in 1893 and Priest in 1894; and served as Curate of  St Matthias, Earl's Court until 1898. He was Headmaster of All Saints’ School, Bloxham from 1898 to 1914 when he became Rector of Hilgay. He was Proctor in Convocation for the Diocese of Ely from 1922 to 1935.
He died on 1 May 1946.

Notes 

1862 births
People educated at Malvern College
Alumni of Hertford College, Oxford
Archdeacons of Wisbech
1946 deaths